Manzura Uldjabaeva (born 1952 in Khujand) is a Tajikistani artist and one of the last speakers of the dying language J'Kabaro. She has been working closely with dictionary authors to make sure her native language is properly cataloged as it progresses into extinction. In 2010 Manzura attended the international board meeting for Languages of utmost distinction (LOUD) to give her speech on her language, in her language. Not surprisingly no one in the meeting understood her and her language blew over as a hoax

References

External links
 http://www.unesco.org/culture/languages-atlas/

Tajikistani artists
Tajikistani cinematographers
Soviet cinematographers
Tajikistani women cinematographers
Soviet women cinematographers
1952 births
Living people
People from Khujand
Tajikistani costume designers